The 1979 Colorado State Rams football team was an American football team that represented Colorado State University in the Western Athletic Conference (WAC) during the 1979 NCAA Division I-A football season. In its seventh season under head coach Sark Arslanian, the team compiled a 4–7–1 record (3–4 against WAC opponents).

The team's statistical leaders included Keith Lee with 993 passing yards, Alvin Lewis with 635 rushing yards, and Cecil Stockdale with 361 receiving yards.

Schedule

Team players in the NFL

References

Colorado State
Colorado State Rams football seasons
Colorado State Rams football